The Strindberg Museum is a museum in Stockholm, Sweden. It is dedicated to the writer August Strindberg (1849-1912) and located in his last dwelling. The site is in the building he nicknamed "Blå tornet" (Blue Tower) at Drottninggatan 85  on the corner of Drottninggatan and Tegnérgatan in the borough of Norrmalm in central Stockholm.

History
The Blue Tower is an art nouveau building with a dominant corner tower. It were erected in 1906-1907 after drawings by the architectural firm of Hagström & Ekman.
The museum is owned by the Strindberg Society of Sweden and was inaugurated in 1973.
It is operated by a  foundation with the Strindberg Society, the City of Stockholm and the Nordic Museum as principals.

Strindberg moved into a three-room apartment on the fourth floor of the building in 1908 and lived there until his death in 1912. The museum consists of Strindberg's flat and library, as well as an area for temporary exhibitions. Wallpapers and other decorations have been reconstructed in accordance with how the flat looked at the time the writer lived there, but furniture and other details are original. In particular, Strindberg's chairs, tables, bed and piano are present. 

The reconstructed apartment, consisting of three rooms on the fourth floor and his library with some 3,000 works on the sixth floor, form the core of the Strindberg Museum.

See also 
 Culture in Stockholm
 Strindbergmuseum Saxen in Austria

References

Other sources
Göran Söderström (1998) Strindbergs bostad i Blå tornet

External links
strindbergsmuseet website

August Strindberg
Strindberg, August
Museums in Stockholm
Literary museums in Sweden
Historic house museums in Sweden
Listed buildings in Stockholm